Pablo Vitti (born 9 July 1985) is an Argentine footballer who plays as striker. In the lasts years Vitti played for different clubs both in his country and abroad, including Ukraine, Canada, Mexico and Ecuador. He is known for his dribbling and finishing ability.

Career

Professional
Vitti started his career at hometown club Rosario Central. He made his breakthrough into the canallas first team in 2004, where he was a consistent goal scorer and was rewarded with the number 10 shirt. Vitti was considered one of the most promising youngsters in the Argentine First Division, but his progression has been halted slightly in recent seasons. He left his hometown club in 2006 to go to Banfield, but he only made fifteen appearances for Banfield without scoring a single goal.

After moving to Independiente he was quickly loaned to Ukrainian Premier League club Chornomorets Odessa. His stay in Odessa was brief, and on 9 February 2009, it was announced that Toronto FC of Major League Soccer had signed Vitti on a loan.

Pablo Vitti scored his first goal for Toronto FC on 24 June 2009 vs. New York Red Bulls. Vitti wore the captain's armband for Toronto FC in an international friendly vs. his fellow countrymen from River Plate at BMO Field on 22 July 2009. He scored 2 goals in 26 MLS games for Toronto in 2009, and returned to Independiente at the end of the season.

After being released by Toronto FC Vitti signed with Peruvian top flight club Universidad San Martín in mid-January. He scored his first goal for the club in a 4–1 over Inti Gas Deportes 6 March 2010. San Martin won the 2010 Torneo Descentralizado with Vitti playing an integral role all season scoring 15 goals in all competitions.

Most considered Vitti to be the best player in the Peruvian League during the 2010 season, earning him a three-year contract with the most successful team in Peru Universitario de Deportes.

In December 2015 it was announced that Vitti would become the joining Ratchaburi in the Thai Premier League.

On 9 August 2016, Vitti signed a one-year contract with Superleague Greece side Veria.

International
Vitti was an integral part of the Argentina Under-20 squad that won the 2005 FIFA World Youth Championship in the Netherlands. Vitti's time with the Argentina youth programs he was considered to be one of Argentina's top prospects on the same level as Lionel Messi and Sergio Agüero his teammates on the winning U-20 team.

Honours

Club
Toronto FC
Canadian Championship (1): 2009

Universidad San Martín
Peruvian Primera División (1): 2010

International
Argentina
FIFA U-20 World Cup (1): 2005

References

External links
MLS player profile
 Argentine Primera statistics

1985 births
Living people
Argentine footballers
Argentina under-20 international footballers
Argentine expatriate footballers
Argentine people of Italian descent
Rosario Central footballers
Club Atlético Banfield footballers
Club Atlético Independiente footballers
FC Chornomorets Odesa players
Toronto FC players
Club Deportivo Universidad de San Martín de Porres players
Club Universitario de Deportes footballers
Querétaro F.C. footballers
L.D.U. Quito footballers
Club Atlético Tigre footballers
San Martín de San Juan footballers
All Boys footballers
Veria F.C. players
Expatriate soccer players in Canada
Expatriate footballers in Peru
Association football forwards
Major League Soccer players
Footballers from Rosario, Santa Fe
Argentine Primera División players
Ukrainian Premier League players
Expatriate footballers in Ukraine
Liga MX players
Peruvian Primera División players
Super League Greece players
Ecuadorian Serie A players
Expatriate footballers in Mexico
Expatriate footballers in Ecuador
Argentina youth international footballers
Argentine expatriate sportspeople in Ukraine
Argentine expatriate sportspeople in Canada
Argentine expatriate sportspeople in Mexico
Argentine expatriate sportspeople in Peru
Argentine expatriate sportspeople in Ecuador